Tourém is a village and parish (freguesia) in the municipality of Montalegre in the far north of Portugal. The main part of the territory of the parish stretches as a small peninsula of Portuguese land within Spanish territory. The northern extremity of the parish is, in formal terms, a Portuguese exclave within Spain, being separated from the rest of the Parish, and the rest of Portugal, by a lake in Spanish territory. This is one of only two exclaves of Portugal. The parish has an area of 16,61 km² and 112 inhabitants (2021).

References 

Freguesias of Montalegre